The Defense of Tsaritsyn, is a 1942 Soviet drama film directed by Vasilyev brothers.

Plot 
The film tells about the defense of Tsaritsyn by the Red Army during the Russian Civil War, under the leadership of Stalin and Voroshilov.

Starring 
 Mikheil Gelovani as Joseph Stalin
 Nikolay Bogolyubov as Kliment Voroshilov
 Mikhail Zharov as Perchikhin
 Varvara Myasnikova as Katya Davydova
 Pyotr Nikashin as Parkhomenko
 Pavel Kadochnikov as Rudnev
 Vladimir Gremin as Nosovich
 Vasili Sofronov as Ryndin
 Boris Babochkin as Moldavskiy

Trivia 
A scene from this movie was featured in the feature film Amelie from 2001, but with different subtitles, referring to Amelie, the main character of the movie.

References

External links 
 

1942 films
1940s Russian-language films
Soviet drama films
1942 drama films
Soviet black-and-white films
Russian Civil War films